Monika Henzinger (born as Monika Rauch, 17 April 1966 in Weiden in der Oberpfalz) is a German computer scientist, and is a former director of research at Google. She is currently a professor at the University of Vienna. Her expertise is mainly on algorithms with a focus on data structures, algorithmic game theory, information retrieval, search algorithms and Web data mining. She is married to Thomas Henzinger and has three children.

Career 
She completed her PhD in 1993 from Princeton University under the supervision of Robert Tarjan. She then became an assistant professor of computer science at Cornell University, a research staff at Digital Equipment Corporation, an associate professor at the Saarland University, a director of research at Google, and a full professor of computer science at  École Polytechnique Fédérale de Lausanne. She is currently a full professor of computer science at the University of Vienna, Austria.

Awards 
 1995: NSF Career Award
 1997: Best Paper, ACM SOSP Conference
 2001: Top 25 Women on the Web Award
 2004: European Young Investigator award
 2009: Olga Taussky Pauli Fellowship
 2010: Member of the "Junge Kurie" of the Austrian Academy of Sciences
 2013: Honorary Doctorate of the Technical University of Dortmund, Germany
 2013: ERC Advanced Grant from the European Research Council
 2013: Elected to Academia Europaea
 2014: One of ten inaugural fellows of the European Association for Theoretical Computer Science
 2014: Elected to German Academy of Sciences Leopoldina
 2017: Fellow of the Association for Computing Machinery
 2021: Wittgenstein Award

Selected publications 
.
.
.

References

External links

Home page

1966 births
Living people
German women computer scientists
German computer scientists
Theoretical computer scientists
Google people
Princeton University alumni
Cornell University faculty
Academic staff of the École Polytechnique Fédérale de Lausanne
Academic staff of the University of Vienna
Members of Academia Europaea
Members of the German Academy of Sciences Leopoldina
Fellows of the Association for Computing Machinery
Game theorists
European Research Council grantees
People from Weiden in der Oberpfalz